Mirza Jamal Javanshir was an Azerbaijani historian and politician, best known as the author of Tarikh-e Qarabagh (History of Karabakh).

Early life 
He was born in 1773 as a member of the Hajili clan of the Javanshir tribe. His father Mohammadkhan Beg was hereditary naib of Javanshir-Dizak mahal of the Karabakh khanate from 1777 to 1794. His family later moved to Shusha as he was appointed as fort commander of Shusha. His grandfather Salif beg Minbashi and his great-grandfather Muhammadsharif Beg also were naibs of Javanshir-Dizak respectively from 1761 to 1777 and 1747 to 1761. He had four younger brothers, one of whom, Qasim beg Javanshir, became the next naib of Javanshir-Dizak from 1805 to 1834. Mirza studied Persian and Turkish, and in 1787-88, at the age of 15, became one of the chancellery scribes of Ibrahim Khalil Khan.

Career under Ibrahim and Mehdigulu 
He fled together with the khan's family to Khunzakh, in 1797, when Aga Mohammad Khan, angered by the betrayal of Ibrahim Khalil Khan and other khans in the Caucasus, attacked and captured Shusha. He became secretary of Bike (Bakhtika) khanum and started to learn Arabic and Avar languages. Meanwhile Agha Mohammad Khan was assassinated in Shusha five days after its capture. Molla Panah Vagif, khan's vizier was captured by Muhammad bey, son of Mehrali bey and claimant to throne after few days. Ibrahim, who had fled to his in-laws in Avar Khanate, then returned to Shusha and gave Aga Mohammad Khan an honourable burial. In order to retain his position and ensure peaceful relations with the shah, he gave one of his daughters to Agha Mohammad Khan's successor to the throne, Fat′h Ali Shah Qajar. Panah Vagif's position was filled by Mirza Jamal Javanshir, who began to act as his vizier.

He accompanied Mammad Hasan agha Javanshir as his secretary during Russo-Persian War of 1804–1813, witnessed battle of Khonashen. Tsitsianov's death on 20 February 1806 in Baku and the breakup of the Russian offensive persuaded Ibrahim Khalil Khan, in the summer of 1806, to repudiate his allegiance to the Russians, and resubmit himself to the shah; he then asked the shah for aid in ousting the Russian garrison. As the Persian army approached Shusha, Ibrahim Khan left the fortress and camped outside. On 12 June 1806, the Russians, instigated by Ibrahim Khalil Khan's grandson and fearful of their own vulnerability, attacked the camp and killed Ibrahim Khan, one of his wives, a daughter, and his youngest son. To gain support from the local Muslims, the Russians appointed a son of Ibrahim Khalil, Mehdigulu Khan Javanshir, as khan of Karabakh. Mirza Jamal remained in service of Mehdigulu until 1822 when the khan fled to Iran. The khanate was subsequently abolished and transformed into a province of the Russian Empire.

Career under Russian Empire 
Mirza Jamal later was appointed by the Russian commandant of Shusha to the post of secretary, in which he served various Russian commanders. He accompanied Valerian Madatov during Russo-Persian War of 1826-28 and managed to move the entire Seyid Ahmadli village across the Araxes river to current Yuxarı Seyidəhmədli and Aşağı Seyidəhmədli villages. He retired in 1840 and died on 13 April 1853.

Legacy
According to Adolf Berge, in addition to Persian, Arabic and Ottoman Turkish languages, Mirza Jamal also knew Avar and Lezgi languages. He had a good knowledge of history, geography and astronomy. He is best known as the author of Tarikh-e Qarabagh upon the order of the Viceroy of the Caucasus Mikhail Vorontsov. Besides this, he authored "A brief overview of the history of Iran" in 1815.

References

1773 births
1853 deaths
19th-century Azerbaijani historians
Karabakh Khanate
Vazirovs
Burials at Mirza Hassan Cemetery